XEPVI-AM was a radio station on 1280 AM in Tepic, Nayarit. The station was owned by Plenitud de Vida, A.C. for the Casa Apostólica Vida Christian church and known as Radio Plenitud.

History
XEPVI received its permit on March 8, 2010, but it did not sign on until April 24, 2014. The station barely broadcast, as in July 2017, Plenitud de Vida surrendered its permit citing financial difficulties.

References

Radio stations in Nayarit
Radio stations disestablished in 2017
Defunct radio stations in Mexico
Radio stations established in 2014